is a manga series by . The manga was published by Akita Shoten; 29 volumes (1982–1991,  magazine), 2003–2006,  magazine, and compiled into 29 tankōbon volumes.

Plot
The stories follow the adventures of Shinokita Reiko (Kita) and Yajima Junko (Yaji) as they move from school to school fighting corruption, Yakuza, gangs, and ninja. Both Yaji and Kita have extraordinary hand-to-hand fighting skills, which they actually work on improving. Yaji's family runs a dojo and Kita's father is a police captain. The characters are based on the theme in Tōkaidōchū Hizakurige, where the characters, often called Yaji and Kita, frequently find themselves in hilarious situations.

Characters

A young woman with shoulder-length black hair. She learned martial arts at her father's dojo. She has a light-hearted personality and sense of humor and can sometimes rush in to a situation without considering the consequences.

A young woman with light brown hair in a bobbed hear-style. She is an expert at kendo and the sword and is more serious and considered in her actions than Junko.

Head of the United Kanto Group, has long brown hair and a feminine appearance although he is excellent in both martial arts and diplomacy. 

He works for the United Kanto Group and has long black hair which is usually tied back. He sometimes wears round glasses when he plays an undercover timid student. He is a Kouga ninja and often helps Junko and Reiko on instructions from Tokuzen Yukiya.

Media

Manga

The manga began serialization in 1982 in Bonita magazine and then in 2003 was transferred to Mystery Bonita magazine, both published by Akita Shoten. It was later compiled into 29 tankōbon volumes.

The manga has been reprinted and collected in multiple editions:
 Yajikita Gakuen Doraka: 29 volumes (1982 - 1991, Bonita. 2003 - 2006, Mystery Bonita, Akita Bookstore).
 Yajikita Gakuin dori Shōwa taishi Hatchobori: 1 volume (2010, Princess GOLD, Akita Bookstore).
 Yajikita Gakuen Doraku II:  12 volumes (2010 - 2015, published by Princess GOLD, Akita Shoten).

Anime
Tales of Yajikita College was adapted into two OVAs series by J.C.Staff released on September 15, 1989 and July 25, 1991.

Episode list

References

External links

1989 manga
Anime series based on manga
Shōjo manga
Juvenile delinquency in fiction